Robert T. Westbrook (born December 24, 1945, New York City) is an American writer. He was born to columnist Sheilah Graham five years after the death of her lover F. Scott Fitzgerald. 

Graham claimed Robert's biological father was Trevor Cresswell Lawrence Westbrook, a British businessman whom she divorced in 1946. After Graham's death in 1988, British philosopher A.J. Ayer came forward to say he was the father of Robert's older half-sister Wendy and that Robert's biological father was most likely the Hollywood actor Robert Taylor. 

Westbrook was raised in Los Angeles until his teen years, when his mother moved Robert and Wendy to New York City. Robert attended the progressive Putney School and Columbia College.

Early career
After a summer trip to the Soviet Union, Westbrook wrote his first book at age 17, Journey Behind the Iron Curtain, which was published in 1963 by G.P. Putnam's Sons. The wild years at Columbia University in the 1960s helped inspire his first novel, The Magic Garden of Stanley Sweetheart, published by Crown in 1970. The novel became an MGM film, with a young, then-unknown actor named Don Johnson in the title role. The film was praised by Andy Warhol for its depiction of the New York counter culture scene of the late 1960s.

In the 1980s, while living with his family in Hawaii, Westbrook began a handful of satirical mysteries set in the 1950s Los Angeles where he had grown up.

In 1988, Westbrook was living in Greece when his mother, Sheilah Graham, died on November 17 in Palm Beach, Florida of congestive heart failure. She left him her papers and directed him to tell her story. He did so, detailing his mother's romance with Fitzgerald. Accessing her notes and letters, he included many details omitted from Graham's best-selling 1958 memoir, Beloved Infidel. Published by HarperCollins in 1995, Westbrook's Intimate Lies is widely considered a valuable contribution to the literature on Fitzgerald and Graham.

1990s to present
Westbrook is probably best known for his Howard Moon Deer mysteries, set in fictional San Geronimo (Taos, New Mexico), which he began writing after he and his wife Gail moved there in 1991. He has also written novels adapted from screenplays, including The Mexican, Insomnia and The Final Cut. He conducts writing workshops in Taos and frequently travels with his wife to teach abroad.

The Torch Singer trilogy
After seven years in the creation, Westbrook released the first two books in The Torch Singer trilogy in August–September 2014. Set in the 1950s Hollywood 'Golden Age,' the books comprise suspense thrillers which follow the 'noir' tradition and detail the life of a young singer who escapes Nazi-occupied Poland to become a Hollywood star - only to die violently in uncertain circumstances at her home in Beverly Hills in 1956.

Books

The Torch Singer Trilogy
Book One: An Overnight Sensation Swan's Nest Canada hardcover, paperback, ebooks (2014)
Book Two: An Almost Perfect Ending Swan's Nest Canada hardcover, paperback, ebooks (2014)

Non-fiction
Intimate Lies HarperCollins (1995) republished, Speaking Volumes, paperback, ebook, 2018

Early works
Journey Behind the Iron Curtain G.P. Putnam's Sons (1963)
The Magic Garden of Stanley Sweetheart Crown (1970)

Left Handed Police Man Mysteries
The Left Handed Police Man Crown(1986) Warner Books paperback (1987), republished, Speaking Volumes, paperback, ebook, 2018
Nostalgia Kills Crown (1988), republished, Speaking Volumes, paperback, ebook, 2018
Lady Left Crown (1990), republished, Speaking Volumes, paperback, ebook, 2018
Rich Kids Birchlane (1992)

Howard Moon Deer Mysteries
Ghost Dancer Signet (1998), republished, Speaking Volumes, paperback, ebook, 2017
Warrior Circle Signet (1999), republished, Speaking Volumes, paperback, ebook, 2017
Red Moon Signet (2000), republished, Speaking Volumes, paperback, ebook, 2017
Ancient Enemy Signet (2001), republished, Speaking Volumes, 2018

"Turquoise Lady" Speaking Volumes, paperback, ebook, 2019

"Blue Moon," Speaking Volumes, paperback, ebook, 2020

Novels based on screenplays
The Mexican Signet (2001) From the film starring Julia Roberts and Brad Pitt
Insomnia Signet (2002) From the mystery thriller starring Al Pacino and Robin Williams
The Final Cut (2004) Adapted from the sci-fi thriller with Robin Williams and Mira Sorvino
The Saudi Connection (2006) Jack Anderson and Robert Westbrook Tor/Forge

Sources

External links 
 Westbrook Author Biography
 Synopses of Intimate Lies with biographical info
 Jewish Women's Archive article on Sheilah Graham by daughter Wendy Fairey

External links
 Westbrook Author Biography
 Robert Westbrook page on Amazon

Living people
1945 births
Columbia College (New York) alumni
Writers from Los Angeles
Writers from New York City
American male writers
American people of Ukrainian-Jewish descent
Jewish American writers
The Putney School alumni
21st-century American Jews